Ternstroemia lineata is a plant species native to high elevations in central Mexico. Many publications call this T. pringlei, but more recent publications confirm that the correct name is T. lineata.

References

lineatea
Flora of Mexico